= Indians in the United States =

Indians in the United States may refer to:

- Indian Americans, people of Indian ancestry resident in the United States
- Native Americans in the United States, also known as American Indians
